NGSR may refer to:

 Nizam's Guaranteed State Railway, a former Indian railway (18791950)
 Northeast Gasoline Supply Reserve, a gasoline reserve in the northeastern United States